Liezietsü is an Angami Naga surname. Notable people with the surname include:

 Khriehu Liezietsu, Indian politician
 Shürhozelie Liezietsu (born 1936), Indian politician

Surnames of Naga origin
Naga-language surnames